Antje Westermann (born 13 September 1971) is a German actress. She appeared in more than thirty films since 1987.

Selected filmography

References

External links 

1971 births
Living people
German film actresses
Actors from Dresden